Please Be Honest is the 23rd album by Dayton, Ohio, rock group Guided by Voices. It was released April 22, 2016, on Guided by Voices Inc. Robert Pollard wrote all the music and played every instrument on the record.

Track listing

References

2016 albums
Guided by Voices albums